Gang Hongrip (1560 – 6 September 1627) was a Korean general during the Joseon Dynasty.

Under repeated requests from Ming China, Gwanghaegun commanded Gang Hongrip to help Ming forces with ten thousand soldiers against the Manchus in 1619. However, Ming armies were crushed in the Battle of Sarhū. The Korean army under command of Liu Ting lost two-thirds of his troops at Fuca and surrendered to Nurhaci. Official Korean records say that Gwanghaegun had ordered a betrayal to Nurhaci, but it is suspected to be a defamation by the Westerners faction, who deposed the king. In 1620 almost all Korean captives were released but Gang Hongrip, who had good command of the Manchu language, was still kept.

Frustrated with unsatisfactory reward for the coup which deposed Gwanghaegun, Yi Gwal rebelled against King Injo in 1624. He temporarily occupied Hanseong (modern-day Seoul), but was eventually crushed. Yi Gwal was then executed by his own soldiers. Han Myeong-nyeon, an accomplice of Yi Gwal, was also killed, but his son Han Yun fled to the Later Jin (Manchus).

Gang Hongrip fell for Han Yun's trick and wrongly believed that his family was all killed by the Joseon government. To get his revenge on Korea, he urged the Manchus to defeat the Joseon dynasty. In 1627 he guided the Later Jin army led by Amin to Hanseong and as a Manchu delegate he negotiated for a truce with Korea. Then he discovered that he was deceived about his family being killed and suffered a heartbreak. He was branded as a traitor and deprived of his official rank. He was rehabilitated after his death.

Family 
Parents
Father: Gang Shin (강신)
Mother: Lady Jeong,  of the Dongrae Jeong clan (본관: 동래정씨), Jeong Gwang-pil's great-granddaughter (정광필) and Jeong Yu-ui's daughter (정유의)
Wives and issues:
Lady Hwang, of the Hwang clan (우주황씨), Hwang Heon's  great-granddaughter (황헌) and Hwang Yi-hyeong's daughter (황이형)
Gang Suk (강숙), first son
Gang Won (강원), second son
Gang Chan (강찬), third son
Lady Gang, of the Jinju Gang clan (진주 강씨), first daughter
Son-in-law: Yun Gam (윤감)
Lady Gang, of the Jinju Gang clan (진주 강씨), second daughter
Lady Gang, of the Jinju Gang clan (진주 강씨), third daughter
Son-in-law: Yi Hyun-dal (이현달)

In popular culture
Portrayed by Ahn Dae-yong in the 1995 KBS2 TV Series West Palace.

See also
 History of Korea

16th-century Korean people
17th-century Korean people
16th-century births
Korean generals
1560 births
1627 deaths